The 2019–20 Toronto Maple Leafs season was the 103rd season for the National Hockey League franchise that was established on November 22, 1917.

The season was suspended by the league officials on March 12, 2020, after several other professional and collegiate sports organizations followed suit as a result of the ongoing COVID-19 pandemic. On May 26, the NHL regular season was officially declared over with the remaining games being cancelled. The Maple Leafs advanced to the qualifying round of the playoffs, but lost to the Columbus Blue Jackets in five games.

Regular season
The season was generally considered disappointing for the Leafs. In the offseason they were predicted to have a strong season and be a major playoff contender. However, they never really lived up to that promise. At the start of the season, John Tavares was named the 25th captain in the history of the Maple Leafs, filling a position that had been vacant since Dion Phaneuf was traded to the Ottawa Senators in February 2016. Auston Matthews, Mitch Marner, and Morgan Rielly were named alternate captains. The Maple Leafs won their season opener 5–3 against the Ottawa Senators on October 3. Matthews scored two goals, becoming the fourth player in NHL history to score in each of his first four-season openers. Ilya Mikheyev also had a goal and an assist in his NHL debut during the season opener. However, the Leafs would go on to post a disappointing 6-5-3 record for October.

On November 20, following a six-game skid and only two regulation wins in their past 16 games, the Maple Leafs fired head coach Mike Babcock, and replaced him with their AHL affiliation Toronto Marlies head coach Sheldon Keefe. After the coaching change, the team saw some improvement.

On February 22, 2020 the Leafs lost a game to the Carolina Hurricanes while David Ayres, a zamboni driver who worked within the Leafs organization, played goal for the Hurricanes after both Hurricane goalies were injured in said game. It was the first time in NHL history that an emergency backup goaltender recorded a win. Steve Dangle's Youtube video titled "THEY LOST TO A ZAMBONI DRIVER" went viral after the game and has since brought in over 900,000 views on his video, and over 450,000 views on his "Dang-Its" series on Sportsnets' channel.

After the NHL was paused in March and resumed in August, the Leafs played the Columbus Blue Jackets in the qualifying round (which was unique to the 2020 NHL Playoffs), and lost the best of 5 series in 5 games.

Standings

Divisional standings

Eastern Conference

Record vs opponents

Notes
 Game decided in overtime
 Game decided in a shootout
 Game cancelled due to COVID-19 pandemic

Schedule and results

Preseason

|- style="background:#fcc;"
| 1 || September 17 || Ottawa Senators || 1–3 || || Kaskisuo (0–1–0) || Mile One Centre ||—|| 0–1–0 || 
|- style="background:#fcc;"
| 2 || September 18 || @ Ottawa Senators || 3–4 || || Hutchinson (0–1–0) || Canadian Tire Centre || 11,531 || 0–2–0 || 
|- style="background:#cfc;"
| 3 || September 20 || Buffalo Sabres || 3–0 || || Andersen (1–0–0) || Scotiabank Arena || 16,232 || 1–2–0 || 
|- style="background:#fcc;"
| 4 || September 21 || @ Buffalo Sabres || 3–5 || || Hutchinson (0–2–0) || KeyBank Center || 17,224 || 1–3–0 || 
|- style="background:#cfc;"
| 5 || September 23 || @ Montreal Canadiens || 3–0 || || Hutchinson (1–2–0) || Bell Centre ||—|| 2–3–0 || 
|- style="background:#cfc;"
| 6 || September 25 || Montreal Canadiens || 3–0 || || Andersen (2–0–0) || Scotiabank Arena || 18,863 || 3–3–0 || 
|- style="background:#cfc;"
| 7 || September 27 || @ Detroit Red Wings || 4–3 || SO || Woll (1–0–0) || Little Caesars Arena ||—|| 4–3–0 || 
|- style="background:#cfc;"
| 8 || September 28 || Detroit Red Wings || 5–0 || || Andersen (3–0–0) || Scotiabank Arena || 18,892 || 5–3–0 || 
|-

Regular season

|- style="background:#cfc;"
| 1 || October 2 || Ottawa Senators || 5–3 || || Andersen (1–0–0) || Scotiabank Arena || 19,612 || 1–0–0 || 2 || 
|- style="background:#cfc;"
| 2 || October 4 || @ Columbus Blue Jackets || 4–1 || || Andersen (2–0–0) || Nationwide Arena || 18,776 || 2–0–0 || 4 || 
|- style="background:#ffc;"
| 3 || October 5 || Montreal Canadiens || 5–6 || SO || Hutchinson (0–0–1) || Scotiabank Arena || 19,547 || 2–0–1 || 5 || 
|- style="background:#fcc;"
| 4 || October 7 || St. Louis Blues || 2–3 || || Andersen (2–1–0) || Scotiabank Arena || 19,466 || 2–1–1 || 5 || 
|- style="background:#fcc;"
| 5 || October 10 || Tampa Bay Lightning || 3–7 || || Andersen (2–2–0) || Scotiabank Arena || 19,387 || 2–2–1 || 5 ||
|- style="background:#cfc;"
| 6 || October 12 || @ Detroit Red Wings || 5–2 || || Andersen (3–2–0) || Little Caesars Arena || 19,515 || 3–2–1 || 7 || 
|- style="background:#cfc;"
| 7 || October 15 || Minnesota Wild || 4–2 || || Andersen (4–2–0) || Scotiabank Arena || 19,149 || 4–2–1 || 9 || 
|- style="background:#fcc;"
| 8 || October 16 || @ Washington Capitals || 3–4 || || Hutchinson (0–1–1) || Capital One Arena || 18,573 || 4–3–1 || 9 || 
|- style="background:#cfc;"
| 9 || October 19 || Boston Bruins || 4–3 || OT || Andersen (5–2–0) || Scotiabank Arena || 19,394 || 5–3–1 || 11 || 
|- style="background:#ffc;"
| 10 || October 21 || Columbus Blue Jackets || 3–4 || OT || Andersen (5–2–1) || Scotiabank Arena || 18,898 || 5–3–2 || 12 || 
|- style="background:#fcc;"
| 11 || October 22 || @ Boston Bruins || 2–4 || || Hutchinson (0–2–1) || TD Garden || 17,193 || 5–4–2 || 12 || 
|- style="background:#cfc;"
| 12 || October 25 || San Jose Sharks || 4–1 || || Andersen (6–2–1) || Scotiabank Arena || 19,102 || 6–4–2 || 14 || 
|- style="background:#fcc;"
| 13 || October 26 || @ Montreal Canadiens || 2–5 || || Hutchinson (0–3–1) || Bell Centre || 21,302 || 6–5–2 || 14 || 
|- style="background:#ffc;"
| 14 || October 29 || Washington Capitals || 3–4 || OT || Andersen (6–2–2) || Scotiabank Arena || 19,258 || 6–5–3 || 15 || 
|-

|- style="background:#cfc;"
| 15 || November 2 || @ Philadelphia Flyers || 4–3 || SO || Andersen (7–2–2) || Wells Fargo Center || 18,441 || 7–5–3 || 17 || 
|- style="background:#cfc;"
| 16 || November 5 || Los Angeles Kings || 3–1 || || Andersen (8–2–2) || Scotiabank Arena || 19,195 || 8–5–3 || 19 || 
|- style="background:#cfc;"
| 17 || November 7 || Vegas Golden Knights || 2–1 || OT || Andersen (9–2–2) || Scotiabank Arena || 19,218 || 9–5–3 || 21 || 
|- style="background:#ffc;"
| 18 || November 9 || Philadelphia Flyers || 2–3 || SO || Andersen (9–2–3) || Scotiabank Arena || 19,279 || 9–5–4 || 22 || 
|- style="background:#fcc;"
| 19 || November 10 || @ Chicago Blackhawks || 4–5 || || Hutchinson (0–4–1) || United Center || 21,598 || 9–6–4 || 22 || 
|- style="background:#fcc;"
| 20 || November 13 || @ New York Islanders || 4–5 || || Andersen (9–3–3) || Nassau Coliseum || 13,293 || 9–7–4 || 22 || 
|- style="background:#fcc;"
| 21 || November 15 || Boston Bruins || 2–4 || || Andersen (9–4–3) || Scotiabank Arena || 19,434 || 9–8–4 || 22 || 
|- style="background:#fcc;"
| 22 || November 16 || @ Pittsburgh Penguins || 1–6 || || Kaskisuo (0–1–0) || PPG Paints Arena || 18,587 || 9–9–4 || 22 || 
|- style="background:#fcc;"
| 23 || November 19 || @ Vegas Golden Knights || 2–4 || || Andersen (9–5–3) || T-Mobile Arena || 18,292 || 9–10–4 || 22 || 
|- style="background:#cfc;"
| 24 || November 21 || @ Arizona Coyotes || 3–1 || || Andersen (10–5–3) || Gila River Arena || 12,495 || 10–10–4 || 24 || 
|- style="background:#cfc;"
| 25 || November 23 || @ Colorado Avalanche || 5–3 || || Andersen (11–5–3) || Pepsi Center || 18,137 || 11–10–4 || 26 || 
|- style="background:#cfc;"
| 26 || November 27 || @ Detroit Red Wings || 6–0 || || Andersen (12–5–3) || Little Caesars Arena || 19,515 || 12–10–4 || 28 || 
|- style="background:#fcc;"
| 27 || November 29 || @ Buffalo Sabres || 4–6 || || Hutchinson (0–5–1) || KeyBank Center || 19,070 || 12–11–4 || 28 || 
|- style="background:#cfc;"
| 28 || November 30 || Buffalo Sabres || 2–1 || OT || Andersen (13–5–3) || Scotiabank Arena || 19,250 || 13–11–4 || 30 || 
|-

|- style="background:#fcc;"
| 29 || December 3 || @ Philadelphia Flyers || 1–6 || || Andersen (13–6–3) || Wells Fargo Center || 15,811 || 13–12–4 || 30 || 
|- style="background:#fcc;"
| 30 || December 4 || Colorado Avalanche || 1–3 || || Andersen (13–7–3) || Scotiabank Arena || 19,351 || 13–13–4 || 30 || 
|- style="background:#cfc;"
| 31 || December 7 || @ St. Louis Blues || 5–2 || || Andersen (14–7–3) || Enterprise Center || 18,096 || 14–13–4 || 32 || 
|- style="background:#cfc;"
| 32 || December 10 || @ Vancouver Canucks || 4–1 || || Andersen (15–7–3) || Rogers Arena || 18,290 || 15–13–4 || 34 || 
|- style="background:#fcc;"
| 33 || December 12 || @ Calgary Flames || 2–4 || || Andersen (15–8–3) || Scotiabank Saddledome || 19,289 || 15–14–4 || 34 || 
|- style="background:#cfc;"
| 34 || December 14 || @ Edmonton Oilers || 4–1 || || Andersen (16–8–3) || Rogers Place || 18,347 || 16–14–4 || 36 || 
|- style="background:#cfc;"
| 35 || December 17 || Buffalo Sabres || 5–3 || || Andersen (17–8–3) || Scotiabank Arena || 19,365 || 17–14–4 || 38 || 
|- style="background:#cfc;"
| 36 || December 20 || @ New York Rangers || 6–3 || || Andersen (18–8–3) || Madison Square Garden || 16,909 || 18–14–4 || 40 || 
|- style="background:#cfc;"
| 37 || December 21 || Detroit Red Wings || 4–1 || || Hutchinson (1–5–1) || Scotiabank Arena || 19,080 || 19–14–4 || 42 || 
|- style="background:#cfc;"
| 38 || December 23 || Carolina Hurricanes || 8–6 || || Andersen (19–8–3) || Scotiabank Arena || 19,176 || 20–14–4 || 44 || 
|- style="background:#cfc;"
| 39 || December 27 || @ New Jersey Devils || 5–4 || OT || Hutchinson (2–5–1) || Prudential Center || 16,514 || 21–14–4 || 46 || 
|- style="background:#ffc;"
| 40 || December 28 || New York Rangers || 4–5 || OT || Andersen (19–8–4) || Scotiabank Arena || 19,492 || 21–14–5 || 47 || 
|- style="background:#cfc;"
| 41 || December 31 || @ Minnesota Wild || 4–1 || || Andersen (20–8–4) || Xcel Energy Center || 18,164 || 22–14–5 || 49 || 
|-

|- style="background:#cfc;"
| 42 || January 2 || @ Winnipeg Jets || 6–3 || || Andersen (21–8–4) || Bell MTS Place || 15,325 || 23–14–5 || 51 || 
|- style="background:#cfc;"
| 43 || January 4 || New York Islanders || 3–0 || || Hutchinson (3–5–1) || Scotiabank Arena || 19,536 || 24–14–5 || 53 || 
|- style="background:#fcc;"
| 44 || January 6 || Edmonton Oilers || 4–6 || || Hutchinson (3–6–1) || Scotiabank Arena || 19,507 || 24–15–5 || 53 || 
|- style="background:#ffc;"
| 45 || January 8 || Winnipeg Jets || 3–4 || SO || Andersen (21–8–5) || Scotiabank Arena || 19,397 || 24–15–6 || 54 || 
|- style="background:#fcc;"
| 46 || January 12 || @ Florida Panthers || 4–8 || || Hutchinson (3–7–1) || BB&T Center || 15,535 || 24–16–6 || 54 || 
|- style="background:#cfc;"
| 47 || January 14 || New Jersey Devils || 7–4 || || Andersen (22–8–5) || Scotiabank Arena || 19,124 || 25–16–6 || 56 || 
|- style="background:#ffc;"
| 48 || January 16 || Calgary Flames || 1–2 || SO || Andersen (22–8–6) || Scotiabank Arena || 19,462 || 25–16–7 || 57 || 
|- style="background:#fcc;"
| 49 || January 18 || Chicago Blackhawks || 2–6 || || Andersen (22–9–6) || Scotiabank Arena || 19,502 || 25–17–7 || 57 || 
|- style="background:#cfc;"
| 50 || January 27 || @ Nashville Predators || 5–2 || || Andersen (23–9–6) || Bridgestone Arena || 17,298 || 26–17–7 || 59 || 
|- style="background:#cfc;"
| 51 || January 29 || @ Dallas Stars || 5–3 || || Andersen (24–9–6) || American Airlines Center || 18,532 || 27–17–7 || 61 || 
|-

|- style="background:#cfc;"
| 52 || February 1 || Ottawa Senators || 2–1 || OT || Hutchinson (4–7–1) || Scotiabank Arena || 19,406 || 28–17–7 || 63 || 
|- style="background:#fcc;"
| 53 || February 3 || Florida Panthers || 3–5 || || Hutchinson (4–8–1) || Scotiabank Arena || 19,156 || 28–18–7 || 63 || 
|- style="background:#fcc;"
| 54 || February 5 || @ New York Rangers || 3–5 || || Hutchinson (4–9–1) || Madison Square Garden || 17,123 || 28–19–7 || 63 || 
|- style="background:#cfc;"
| 55 || February 7 || Anaheim Ducks || 5–4 || OT || Campbell (1–0–0) || Scotiabank Arena || 19,077 || 29–19–7 || 65 || 
|- style="background:#ffc;"
| 56 || February 8 || @ Montreal Canadiens || 1–2 || OT || Campbell (1–0–1) || Bell Centre || 21,302 || 29–19–8 || 66 || 
|- style="background:#cfc;"
| 57 || February 11 || Arizona Coyotes || 3–2 || OT || Campbell (2–0–1) || Scotiabank Arena || 19,039 || 30–19–8 || 68 || 
|- style="background:#fcc;"
| 58 || February 13 || Dallas Stars || 2–3 || || Andersen (24–10–6) || Scotiabank Arena || 19,107 || 30–20–8 || 68 || 
|- style="background:#cfc;"
| 59 || February 15 || @ Ottawa Senators || 4–2 || || Campbell (3–0–1) || Canadian Tire Centre || 18,544 || 31–20–8 || 70 || 
|- style="background:#fcc;"
| 60 || February 16 || @ Buffalo Sabres || 2–5 || || Andersen (24–11–6) || KeyBank Center || 19,070 || 31–21–8 || 70 || 
|- style="background:#fcc;"
| 61 || February 18 || @ Pittsburgh Penguins || 2–5 || || Andersen (24–12–6) || PPG Paints Arena || 18,466 || 31–22–8 || 70 || 
|- style="background:#cfc;"
| 62 || February 20 || Pittsburgh Penguins || 4–0 || || Andersen (25–12–6) || Scotiabank Arena || 19,386 || 32–22–8 || 72 || 
|- style="background:#fcc;"
| 63 || February 22 || Carolina Hurricanes || 3–6 || || Andersen (25–13–6) || Scotiabank Arena || 19,414 || 32–23–8 || 72 || 
|- style="background:#cfc;"
| 64 || February 25 || @ Tampa Bay Lightning || 4–3 || || Andersen (26–13–6) || Amalie Arena || 19,092 || 33–23–8 || 74 || 
|- style="background:#cfc;"
| 65 || February 27 || @ Florida Panthers || 5–3 || || Andersen (27–13–6) || BB&T Center || 16,322 || 34–23–8 || 76 || 
|- style="background:#cfc;"
| 66 || February 29 || Vancouver Canucks || 4–2 || || Andersen (28–13–6) || Scotiabank Arena || 19,371 || 35–23–8 || 78 || 
|-

|- style="background:#fcc;"
| 67 || March 3 || @ San Jose Sharks || 2–5 || || Campbell (3–1–1) || SAP Center || 16,129 || 35–24–8 || 78 || 
|- style="background:#ffc;"
| 68 || March 5 || @ Los Angeles Kings || 0–1 || SO || Andersen (28–13–7) || Staples Center || 17,495 || 35–24–9 || 79 || 
|- style="background:#fcc;"
| 69 || March 6 || @ Anaheim Ducks || 1–2 || || Campbell (3–2–1) || Honda Center || 15,984 || 35–25–9 || 79 || 
|- style="background:#cfc;"
| 70 || March 10 || Tampa Bay Lightning || 2–1 || || Andersen (29–13–7) || Scotiabank Arena || 19,124 || 36–25–9 || 81 || 
|-

|-
| 71 || March 12 || Nashville Predators || Scotiabank Arena
|- style="background:#;"
| 72 || March 14 || @ Boston Bruins || TD Garden
|- style="background:#;"
| 73 || March 17 || New Jersey Devils || Scotiabank Arena
|- style="background:#;"
| 74 || March 19 || New York Islanders || Scotiabank Arena
|- style="background:#;"
| 75 || March 21 || Columbus Blue Jackets || Scotiabank Arena
|- style="background:#;"
| 76 || March 23 || Florida Panthers || Scotiabank Arena
|- style="background:#;"
| 77 || March 25 || @ Tampa Bay Lightning || Amalie Arena
|- style="background:#;"
| 78 || March 26 || @ Carolina Hurricanes || PNC Arena
|- style="background:#;"
| 79 || March 28 || @ Ottawa Senators || Canadian Tire Centre
|- style="background:#;"
| 80 || March 31 || @ Washington Capitals || Capital One Arena
|- style="background:#;"
| 81 || April 2 || Detroit Red Wings || Scotiabank Arena
|- style="background:#;"
| 82 || April 4 || Montreal Canadiens || Scotiabank Arena
|-

|-
| 2019–20 schedule

Overtime statistics

Playoffs

The Maple Leafs were defeated by the Columbus Blue Jackets in the qualifying round in five games.

|- style="background:#fcc;"
| 1 || August 2 || Columbus Blue Jackets || 0–2 || || Andersen (0–1) || Scotiabank Arena || 0–1 || 
|- style="background:#cfc;"
| 2 || August 4 || Columbus Blue Jackets || 3–0 || || Andersen (1–1) || Scotiabank Arena || 1–1 || 
|- style="background:#fcc;"
| 3 || August 6 || @ Columbus Blue Jackets || 3–4 || OT || Andersen (1–2) || Scotiabank Arena || 1–2 || 
|- style="background:#cfc;"
| 4 || August 7 || @ Columbus Blue Jackets || 4–3 || OT || Andersen (2–2) || Scotiabank Arena || 2–2 || 
|- style="background:#fcc;"
| 5 || August 9 || Columbus Blue Jackets || 0–3 || || Andersen (2–3) || Scotiabank Arena || 2–3 || 
|-

|-
|

Player statistics

Skaters

Goaltenders

(M) Player currently playing for the minor league affiliate Toronto Marlies of the AHL 
(X) Player is no longer with the Maple Leafs organization 
(p) Player previously played with another team before being acquired by Toronto
Bold/italics denotes franchise record.

Transactions
The Maple Leafs have been involved in the following transactions during the 2019–20 season.

Trades

Free agents

Waivers

Contract terminations

Retirement

Signings

Draft picks

Below are the Toronto Maple Leafs' selections at the 2019 NHL Entry Draft, which was held on June 21 and 22, 2019, at Rogers Arena in Vancouver, British Columbia. The Leafs held on to four of their own seven picks (rounds 2, 3, 4, 5). In January 2019 they had traded away their first round pick along with Carl Grundström to Los Angeles for Jake Muzzin. During last year's draft they traded away this year's 6th round draft pick to Buffalo in exchange for the Sabres' 2018 6th round pick. Finally, before their 7th round pick was made they traded it to St. Louis in exchange for the Blues' 7th round pick in 2020. They acquired an additional two picks this year through various trades.

Notes:
 The St. Louis Blues' fourth-round pick went to the Toronto Maple Leafs as the result of a trade on February 15, 2018, that sent Nikita Soshnikov to St. Louis in exchange for this pick.
 The Dallas Stars' seventh-round pick went to the Toronto Maple Leafs as the result of a trade on October 1, 2018, that sent Connor Carrick to Dallas in exchange for this pick (being conditional at the time of the trade).

References

Toronto Maple Leafs seasons
Toronto Maple Leafs
Maple Leafs
2019 in Toronto
2020 in Toronto